THT may refer to:

 Tetrahydrothiophene
 Through-hole technology, category of electronic components
 The Hardball Times
 The Terrence Higgins Trust, British sexual health charity
 The History Teacher, a quarterly academic journal
 Thorntonhall railway station, Scotland, code 
 Tamchakett Airport, Mauritania, IATA code
 Talen Horton-Tucker, NBA basketball player